Mali Singh is a village in the Punjab province of Pakistan. It is located at 30°41'30N 73°47'0E with an altitude of 169 metres (557 feet).

References 

Villages in Punjab, Pakistan